Barguna ( Borguna) is a district in the division of Barisal,  Bangladesh. It is situated in the southern part of Bangladesh. Barguna subdivision was established in 1969 and promoted to district on 28 February 1984.

History 
Barguna district was in the Sundarban area. In the evolution of time, people started clearing the forest by cutting down the trees and started to live here. Wood merchants used to come here to collect woods from the forest.

Etymology 
There is not enough strong proof of naming the district. Some historians say that timber traders of the northern region came here to buy timbers and waited for the favoring flow (Baro - Gone) to overcome and from there the name "Baro-Gana" was derived. Others say that it was named after a famous Rakhine resident of this district while some say that the name came from a bawali named "Barguna"

Geography
The Barguna District has a total area of 1939.39 km2. It was established as a district on 28 February 1984. It is bounded on the north by the districts of Jhalkathi, Barisal, Pirojpur and Patuakhali. In the east, it borders the Patuakhali district. On the south, Barguna is bounded by the Patuakhali district, and the Bay of Bengal. On the western side, it borders Pirojpur and Bagerhat districts. There are six upazilas, six thanas, four municipalities, 42 unions and 560 villages. Important rivers include the Paira River, Bishkhali River, Khakdon river, Baleshwar River and Haringhata river. The total area of the river is 160 km2 which is 22% of the total area of the district. Moreover, there are 300 natural canals in the district.  The average annual temperature is 33.3° Celsius and annual lowest temperature is 12.1° Celsius. Annual rainfall of the district is 2506 mm. Total area of reserved forest area is 30533.90 acres.

Administration
Barguna district has 6 upazilas and 42 unions. Taltali is the newest. The upazilas are:

Economy
Barguna's economy is primarily dependent on agriculture. Principal crops include rice and pulses. Jute cultivation was once important, but it gradually lost popularity as a cash crop. Being a coastal district, Barguna has a thriving fishing industry. Produce of the district includes betel leaf, pulses, bananas, betel nut, molasses, marine fish, and shrimp. Total area of agricultural land is 104231 hectares.

There is no major industry in this district. A number of small manufacturing industries comprise mostly rice mills, saw mill, soap factory, flour mill, ice factory and pen factory. There are 25 food processing industries, 10 chemical industries, 10 textile home-craft industries and 35 miscellaneous industries in this district. Majority of the industries are in the sadar area and the remainings are in different upazilas. Traditional cottage industries such as weaving, bamboo and cane art work, goldsmithing, blacksmithing, pottery, wood work, and tailoring also thrive in rural areas.

Demographics

As of 2011, Barguna District had an overall population of 892,781 with a population density of 460 people per km2. Females constitute a majority of the population with 51.01% while males constitute 48.99%. Rural population is 789,687 (88.45%) and urban population 103,094 (11.55%) Total numbers of voters are 662,375. Ethnic population is 1143, 1059 of whom are Rakhine.

Religion

The overwhelming majority of the population of the district is Muslim, with the population share of Hindus seeing a decline since the 1981 census, when they constituted 9.35 per cent. The same has been true for Buddhists and Christians. Similar to other districts in the Barisal division, the absolute number of all the three minority populations reduced in the 2001-2011 period.

The district has 3760 mosques, 144 temples, one church and 18 Buddhist pagodas.

Education 
Literacy rate of Barguna district is 62.10%. 
Barguna town is a home to many educational institutions. Barguna Zilla School is the oldest school in the town established in 1927 as Barguna Middle English School by Mr. Ramzan Ali Akon. Notable schools and colleges include Barguna Government College, Barguna Government Women's College, Barguna Zilla School, Barguna Govt. Girls High School, Gourichanna Nawab Salimullah Secondary School etc. Besides these, there are two teacher training colleges, a Government Polytechnic institute, a technical school and college and a textile vocational institute in the town. The educational activities are operated under the Board of Intermediate and Secondary Education, Barisal. There are total 1332 educational institutions. There are 2 government and 22 non government colleges, 2 government and 148 non government high schools,  814 government primary schools, 339 madrasas, one non government B.Ed. college, one government primary teachers training institute, one government polytechnic institute, one government technical institute and college and one government textile vocational institute. Notable educational institutions are:

 Barguna Polytechnic Institute
 Patharghata K. M. Secondary School
 Ramna Sher-E-Bangla Samabay High School,
 Govt. Sarwarjan Pilot Model School & College
 BEGUM FAIZUNNESSA MOHILA DEGREE COLLEGE
 Halta Dauwatala Wazed Ali Khan Degree College
 Taslima Memorial Academy
 Barguna Govt. College
 Govt. Bamna College
 Barguna Zilla School
 Barguna Govt. Girls school

Health 
There is a modern government general hospital in this district which has 100 bed capacity but an upgradation of 250 bed capacity is under construction. Besides this, there are 5 upazila health complexes, 8 upazila health centres and 123 community clinics in this district. There are total 32 government doctors servicing this whole district. There is a lack of total 134 doctors in the hospitals and clinics.

Transportation 
There is direct connection from the capital to this district by road. The total length of Upazila Road is 464 km, of which 352 km is concrete and 112 km is dirt. The total length of Union Road is 568 km. 336 km, of which is concrete and 232 km is dirt. Sakura travels, Mia travels, Abdullah travels, Sugandha travels, Patuakhali express, Meghna travels, and Saudia travels are major bus travels.

Total length of riverway is 250 nautical miles. M.V. Bandhan-7, Juboraj-4, Juboraj-2, Allahu Marji, Nusrat, Mashiran Khan, Tipu-3 are some of naval transports available in this district.

There is no airport in this district.

Member of the eleventh Jatiyo Sangsad (2020 - current)

Notable places 

 Bibichini Shahi Mosque, located at Betagi
 Buddhist temple, located at Taltali
 Buddhist Academy
 Horin Ghata Eco Park, located at Patharghata
Ashar Char
Bihanga Island

Notable people
 Qamarul Ahsan, politician and litterateur
 Syed Rahmatur Rob Irtiza Ahsan, politician
 Md. Akhtaruzzaman, Vice-Chancellor, University of Dhaka, was born in Kalipur village
 Zafrul Hasan Farhad, former parliamentarian
 Delwar Hossain, politician
 Shahjada Abdul Malek Khan, politician
 Abdul Kader Mia, member of the Bengal Legislative Assembly
 Nurul Islam Moni, politician
 Sultana Nadira, politician
 Siddiqur Rahman, politician
 Mir Sabbir, actor

See also
 Districts of Bangladesh
 Barisal Division

Notes

References

External links

 

 
Districts of Bangladesh